Parvoscincus kitangladensis  is a species of skink found in the Philippines.

References

Parvoscincus
Reptiles described in 1995
Taxa named by Walter Creighton Brown